William McNaught (9 May 1922 – 12 April 1989) was a Scottish footballer, who was born in Dumfries. McNaught holds the Raith Rovers club record for the number of appearances with the club of 657 between 1941 and 1962. McNaught was club captain and at international gained five full Scotland caps and six Scottish League caps. McNaught's son is European Cup winning footballer Ken McNaught.

Club career

But for the war, McNaught may have been a player of his home town club Queen of the South. The stylish full back or half back was spotted playing in army football by a Raith Rovers official who wasted no time in signing him. He went on to form part of the half back line that is still iconically revered at Raith Rovers along with Andy Young and Andy Leigh.

With the resumption of national league football in 1946–47 after the end of World War II, Raith were in Scotland's second tier. They improved season on season with finishes of sixth and fourth before being promoted as B Division champions in 1949. From then they stayed in Scotland's top flight until after McNaught's 1962 departure. The highlight of the 1950s golden era was undoubtedly the 5–1 destruction of Rangers at Stark's Park in December 1956. It was the peak of the greatest Raith Rovers team in 30 years and, for a while, they looked genuine championship contenders, eventually finishing in fourth place, their highest position since 1922, surpassing the fifth place of 1952 and one that has not been bettered since. Rovers were relegated the season after McNaught's departure to Brechin City.

In McNaught's time Raith had runs to the Scottish Cup semi finals in 1951, 1956 and 1957 as well as a quarter final defeat to Rangers in 1950 that required two replays. The crowd of 84,640 to watch the 1951 semi final 3–2 defeat to Celtic at Hampden Park in Celtic's native Glasgow is the largest ever to see a Raith Rovers game. Cup runs weren't exclusive to the Scottish Cup. Raith made it to the 1948–49 Scottish League Cup Final where they went down 2–0 to Rangers.

There was more to McNaught's game than just composure and elegance. Jim Baxter later commented of his "Iron Man" captain from his earliest days in professional football, "I would never have made it in today's circumstances. I needed bastards like Carmichael, Buckard, Ferrier, Herdman and McNaught. Young players like I was would simply tell them to get stuffed and take their talent elsewhere. I owe them."

Hearts legend Willie Bauld's tributes to his opponents were legion and seldom. Bauld though professed a great admiration for Willie McNaught as the man who gave Bauld his toughest games. The then veteran McNaught was fondly remembered by ex Raith teammate Jim Menzies as a real gentleman and inspiration for the younger players. Ex Cowdenbeath Tom Dawson played beside McNaught in retirement with Fife all-stars commenting, "The guy that amazed me in those games was ex-Raith and Scotland star Willie McNaught. Even at the age of 52 he would just stroll through games."

International career

McNaught gained 5 full international caps for Scotland.

McNaught also represented the Scottish League six times and was a winner on all six occasions. This was 2 wins against each of the English League, the Irish League and the League of Ireland.

Legacy

McNaught was among the first group of inductees into the Raith Rovers Hall of Fame. His son Ken won the European Cup playing centre back with Aston Villa.

Honours

 Scottish B Division Championship – 1949
 Scottish Cup semi finalist – 1951, 1956, 1957
 Scottish League Cup finalist – 1949

References

External links

1922 births
1989 deaths
Brechin City F.C. players
Association football defenders
Raith Rovers F.C. players
Scotland international footballers
Scottish Football League players
Scottish footballers
Footballers from Dumfries
Scottish Football League representative players
Place of death missing